The Kuwait Mini World Futsal Club Tournament is the first Mini World Futsal Club tournament. It was held in Kuwait City, Kuwait between July 10 and July 26, 2013.

Qualified teams 
The following sixteen teams played the final tournament.

 Alumnus Zagreb (6th Croatian 1.HMNL 2012-13)
 Al-Muharraq (Champion Bahrain Futsal League 2012)
 Al Nassr (No Local Lige)
 Al-Sadd (Champion Qatar Futsal League 2012–2013)
 Atlético Huila (Semi-Finals Col Liga Argos Futsal 2012)
 Chonburi Blue Wave (Champion Thailand Futsal League 2012–13)
 City'us Târgu Mureş (Champion Liga I 2012–13)
 Dabiri Tabriz (4th Iranian Futsal Super League 2012–13)
 Erdre-Atlantique (Runner-up Championnat de France de Futsal 2012-13)
 Kardinal Rivne (6th Extra-Liga 2012-13)
 Kazma (Runner-up KUW Futsal League 12-13)
 Misr LelMakasa 
 Pinocho (Champion Argentine División de Honor de Futsal 2012)
 Qadsia (Champion KUW Futsal League 12-13)
 Santiago (7th Primera División de Futsal 2012–13)
 Sport Colonial (10th Liga Nacional de Futsal FIFA de Paraguay 2012)

Group stage

Group A

Group B

Group C

Group D

Knockout stage

Quarter-finals

Semi-finals

Third place play-off

Final

Awards 

 Best Player
 Alan Brandi
 Top Scorer
 Hrvoje Penava (7 goals)
 Best Goalkeeper
 Dieniuzhkin Vitalii
 Best Young Player
 Kristijan Postruzin
 Fair-Play Award
 Alumnus Zagreb

Goalscorers 
7 goals

  Hrvoje Penava (Alumnus Zagreb)

5 goals

  Cherniienko Andrii (MFC Kardinal Rivne)
  Alan (Santiago)
  Oleksandr Bondar (MFC Kardinal Rivne)

4 goals

  Rafael Novaes (Qadsia)
  Rafael Soua (Qadsia)
  Vahid Shamsaei (Dabiri Tabriz)
  Lucas Maina (Pinocho)
  Robert Lupu (City'us Târgu Mureş)

3 goals

  Alan Calo (Pinocho)
  Enmanuel Ayala (Sport Colonial)
  Cristian Matei (City'us Târgu Mureş)
  Serhii Piddubnyi (MFC Kardinal Rivne)
  Javier Moreno (Erdre-Atlantique)
  David (Santiago)
  Magno Daniel Silva (Sport Colonial)
  Ayman Ibrahem Abdulkader (Misr LelMakasa)
  Marcinho (Qadsia)
  Rodriguinho (Al Sadd)
  Samer Sami Waheed (Al Sadd)

2 goals

  Miller Eduardo Cabrera (Atlético Huila)
  Jhon Alexander Rodríguez (Atlético Huila)
  Ali Saleh Frih (Al-Muharraq)
  Mahmooud Abdulrahman (Al-Muharraq)
  Ahmed Mohamed (Al-Muharraq)
  Ahmad Ysry Abdullatef (Misr LelMakasa)
  Ramadan Samasry (Misr LelMakasa)
  Nattawut Madyalan (Chonburi Blue Wave)
  Celso Sanz Sendon (Erdre-Atlantique)
  Cosmin Gherman (City'us Târgu Mureş)
  Mohamed Ismail Ahmed Ismail (Al Sadd)
  Ighor Fernando Galvao (Al-Muharraq)
  Josip Jurić (Alumnus Zagreb)
  David Pazos (Santiago)
  Quintela (Santiago)
  Daniel Ibañes Caetano (Kazma)
  Flavio Barreto Arantes (Al Sadd)
  Tiago Ignatiuk (Qadsia)
  Matija Capar (Alumnus Zagreb)

1 goals

  Lucas Chianelli (Pinocho)
  German Abel Corazza (Pinocho)
  Mauro Quetgla (Pinocho)
  Gabriel Fafasuli (Pinocho)
  Jefferson Moreno Rueda (Atlético Huila)
  Jesús Fernando Tejada Bonilla (Atlético Huila)
  Angel Ayuso Pico (Erdre-Atlantique)
  Roberto Garcia (Erdre-Atlantique)
  Hamza (Santiago)
  Lucho (Santiago)
  Jassam Saleh (Al-Muharraq)
  Sergii Trygubets (MFC Kardinal Rivne)
  Fareniuk Artem (MFC Kardinal Rivne)
  Mizo (Misr LelMakasa)
  Ahmed Hussein (Misr LelMakasa)
  Mohammad Ibrahem Idrees (Misr LelMakasa)
  Xapa (Chonburi Blue Wave)
  Gabriel Martins (Qadsia)
  Yahya Al Shehry (Al Nassr)
  Kristijan Postruzin (Alumnus Zagreb)
  Karim Bentaifour (Erdre-Atlantique)
  João Vieira (Kazma)
  Nasrollah Momen (Dabiri Tabriz)
  Rashid Gholipour (Dabiri Tabriz)
  Mehran Rezapour (Dabiri Tabriz)
  Farhad Fakhim (Dabiri Tabriz)
  Javad Asghari Moghaddam (Dabiri Tabriz)
  Amro Mohaseen (Al Sadd)
  Sarawut Jaipetch (Chonburi Blue Wave)
  Suphawut Thueanklang (Chonburi Blue Wave)
  Kritsada Wongkaeo (Chonburi Blue Wave)
  Dumitru Stoica (City'us Târgu Mureş)
  Bogdan Covaci (City'us Târgu Mureş)

External links 
Official website
Futsal Planet

Mini World Futsal Club Tournament
Futsal